Flashfire may refer to:

Flashfire (film), 1993 film starring Billy Zane and Louis Gossett Jr.
Flashfire (Stark novel), 2000 Parker novel by Richard Stark
Flashfire (novel), 2006 science fiction novel by David Sherman and Dan Cragg
Flashfire (comics),  fictional character in the Marvel Universe
Flash fire, sudden, intense fire caused by the ignition of flammable substances in the air